The 1978–79 Alpha Ethniki was the 43rd season of the highest football league of Greece. The season began on 3 September 1978 and ended on 3 June 1979. AEK Athens won their second consecutive and seventh Greek title.

The point system was: Win: 2 points - Draw: 1 point.

League table

Results

Top scorers

References

External links
Official Greek FA Site
Greek SuperLeague official Site
SuperLeague Statistics

Alpha Ethniki seasons
Greece
1978–79 in Greek football leagues